Juttaporn Krasaeyan (born 13 February 1971) is a Thai shot putter. She previously competed for China, where she was born, under the name Wu Xianchun.

Her personal best throw is 19.43 metres, achieved in May 1995 in Taiyuan. For Thailand she holds a national record of 18.24 metres, achieved at the 1998 Asian Games in Bangkok. She is also the Thai record holder in discus throw.

International competitions

References

External links

1971 births
Living people
Chinese female shot putters
Juttaporn Krasaeyan
Juttaporn Krasaeyan
Juttaporn Krasaeyan
Athletes (track and field) at the 2004 Summer Olympics
Asian Games medalists in athletics (track and field)
Athletes (track and field) at the 1998 Asian Games
Athletes (track and field) at the 2002 Asian Games
Juttaporn Krasaeyan
Universiade medalists in athletics (track and field)
Juttaporn Krasaeyan
Southeast Asian Games medalists in athletics
Juttaporn Krasaeyan
Juttaporn Krasaeyan
Medalists at the 1998 Asian Games
Medalists at the 2002 Asian Games
Competitors at the 2003 Southeast Asian Games
Competitors at the 2005 Southeast Asian Games
Competitors at the 2007 Southeast Asian Games
Competitors at the 2009 Southeast Asian Games
Competitors at the 2011 Southeast Asian Games
Universiade gold medalists for China
Juttaporn Krasaeyan
Juttaporn Krasaeyan